Alcochete is a municipality in Portugal. The population in 2011 was 17,569, in an area of 128.36 km². The municipality is composed of three parishes and is located in Setúbal District.

Alcochete is known for its bullfighting tradition and its proximity to the second-longest bridge in Europe, the Vasco da Gama Bridge.

The actual site of present-day Alcochete was already occupied during Roman times with a clay production facility. Its name is thought to derive from the Arabic word for oven for reasons not yet understood. It became a vacation site preferred by the Portuguese royalty and the future king D. Manuel I was born in the village. It has experienced major development due to the construction of the Vasco da Gama Bridge.

On January 10, 2008, Portuguese prime minister José Sócrates announced that Alcochete had been selected as the site of the new airport serving Lisbon, Portugal's capital.  The existing Portela Airport, which is located within the city of Lisbon itself, has become too small to handle demand.  This preliminary decision will be finalised after public consultation. The location of Alcochete as the construction site of the future Lisbon Airport was confirmed by the Portuguese Government on May 8, 2008.

Sporting Clube de Portugal has a football training facility (Academia Sporting in Alcochete), which accommodated Portugal during the Euro 2004 competition. Famous for its football youth academy system which features a range of well-equipped facilities and is one of the most renowned in the world, Sporting has continuously developed many world class footballers, such as Ballon d'Or recipients Cristiano Ronaldo and Luís Figo.

Parishes
Administratively, the municipality is divided into 3 civil parishes (freguesias):
 Alcochete
 Samouco
 São Francisco

Notable people 
 Manuel I of Portugal (1469–1521) King of Portugal from 1495 to 1521, member of the House of Aviz
 Francisco Rodrigues da Cruz (1859–1948) a Portuguese priest of the Catholic Church, known as Father Cruz
 Frederico Barrigana (1922–2007) a Portuguese football goalkeeper with 260 caps with FC Porto.
 Francisco Bolota (born 1946) a Portuguese former footballer with approximately 250 club caps

External links

Town Hall official website
Photos from ALCOCHETE

References

 
Towns in Portugal
Populated places in Setúbal District
Municipalities of Setúbal District